Botnen is a village in Ullensvang municipality in Vestland county, Norway. There is no people currently living in the village.  The village is located at the southern end of the lake Røldalsvatnet. It is connected by Norwegian National Road 13 to the village of Nesflaten in Suldal municipality to the south.  Historically, the village was part of the old municipality of Røldal.

References

Villages in Vestland
Ullensvang